The 1983–84 Temple Owls men's basketball team represented Temple University as a member of the Atlantic 10 Conference during the 1983–84 NCAA Division I men's basketball season.

Roster

Schedule

|-
!colspan=12 style=| Regular season

|-
!colspan=12 style=| Atlantic 10 Tournament

|-
!colspan=12 style=| NCAA Tournament

Rankings

NBA Draft

References

Temple Owls men's basketball seasons
Temple
Temple
Temple
Temple